Dareshgeft (also Romanized as Darreh Eshgaft and Darreh-ye Eshkaft) is a village in Sepiddasht Rural District, Papi District, Khorramabad County, Lorestan Province, Iran. At the 2006 census, its population was 162, in 28 families.

References 

Towns and villages in Khorramabad County